Ernst Mauritz Manker (20 March 1893 – 1 February 1972) was a Swedish ethnographer, known for his work on Sami history and ethnography.

He was born in Tjörn, son of a sea captain, later a farmer. He graduated as fil.kand. from Göteborgs högskola 1924 with a major in ethnography. His first job was at Museum of Ethnography in Stockholm, where he studied African cultures and wrote Kristallbergens folk (1929).

Journeys in Sami districts in the 1920s, especially a trekking in 1926, made Sami history his main field. When a Sami section was established at Nordic Museum in 1939, he became its first manager. By then, he was already working with his major work on sami drums, Die lappische Zaubertrommel (2 volumes, 1938 og 1950). He also wrote The nomadism of the Swedish mountain Lapps (1953), Lapparnas heliga ställen (1957) og Fångstgropar och stalotomter (1960).

Manker was chairman of Svenska fjällklubben 1949-58, and became member of Finno-Ugrian Society 1942, and Royal Skyttean Society 1956. He became an honorary member of Royal Anthropological Institute 1947, gained an honorary degree at Stockholms universitet 1953, was awarded Qvigstadmedaljen from Tromsø Museum 1967 and Svenska Turistföreningen's Dag Hammarskjöld-medalj 1967. He was awarded both Order of Vasa and Order of Orange-Nassau.

Referanser

External links  
 

1893 births
1972 deaths
Swedish ethnographers
Sámi history
People from Tjörn Municipality